Marguerite de Helfenstein (1480–1537) was the illegitimate daughter of Maximilian I, Holy Roman Emperor.

She married the German Count Louis de Helfenstein.  They were taken hostage after the Siege of Weinsberg in 1525 during the Peasant's Revolt. She was liberated by the army of the Princes, and took refuge at the court of Margaret of Austria, Duchess of Savoy, the regent of the Netherlands. She was given an allowance by Margaret and the emperor.

References
 Biographie Nationale Tome 5

1537 deaths
People of the Habsburg Netherlands
Illegitimate children of German monarchs
16th-century German people
1480 births